Small block may refer to:
Small Block (album), an album by Big Drill Car.
Small-block, a type of automobile engine block.
A type of Single Level Cell (SLC) NAND flash memory produced by Samsung. Small block memory usually has smaller capacity than the large block versions, but the real difference lies in the minimally addressable memory page size.  As of 2006, small block memory comes in 8-bit packages, and has page size of 512+16 bytes (16Kibi+512 bytes for page erase).  In contrast, large block memory comes in 8 or 16-bit packages (16-bit devices starts at 2Gibibit or above), with page size of 2Kibi+64 bytes (128 Kibi+4 Kibi bytes for block erase).